"Colostethus" ruthveni is a species of frog in the family Dendrobatidae. It is endemic to the Magdalena Department in northern Colombia. The specific name ruthveni honors Alexander Grant Ruthven, an American herpetologist. It is known from the lower slopes of the north-western portion of the Sierra Nevada de Santa Marta. Its natural habitats are tropical dry forests and cloud forests where it occurs near streams, and is threatened by habitat loss.

References

ruthveni
Amphibians of Colombia
Endemic fauna of Colombia
Amphibians described in 1997
Taxonomy articles created by Polbot